Minin and Pozharsky is a 1939 Soviet historical drama directed by Vsevolod Pudovkin and Mikhail Doller, based on Viktor Shklovsky's novel "Russians at the Beginning of the XVII Century".

The film is about the Time of Troubles, Russia's struggle for independence led by Dmitry Pozharsky and Kuzma Minin against the Polish invasion in 1611–1612. It was the first of several important Soviet films to show Poland as an aggressor.

In 1941, Pudovkin, Livanov, and Khanov received the Stalin Prize.

Cast
 Aleksandr Khanov as Kuzma Minin
 Boris Livanov as Prince Dmitri Pozharsky
 Boris Chirkov as Ra Hetman Jan Karol Chodkiewicz
 Lev Sverdlin as  Grigori Orlov
 Vladimir Moskvin as Stepan Khoroshev, stablehand-conspirator
 Sergei Komarov as Count Vasili Andreyevich Trubetskoi
 Yevgeny Kaluzhhky as Ivan Zarutsky
 Lev Fenin as Lt. Smith, Swedish mercenary
 Mikhail Astangov as King Sigismund III of Poland
 Ivan Chuvelyov as Peasant Conspirator-Leader
 Vladimir Dorofeyev as Ovtsyn
 Yelizaveta Kuzyurina as Pozharskaya
 Nina Nikitina as Palashka
 Pyotr Sobolevsky as Anokha, peasant
 Yevgeni Gurov as Jesuit de Mallo
 Mikhail Gluzsky as Pozharsky's servant
 Andrei Fajt  as Polish man

References

External links

1939 films
Mosfilm films
Soviet black-and-white films
Films directed by Vsevolod Pudovkin
Soviet historical drama films
1930s historical drama films
Films set in the 1610s
Films directed by Mikhail Doller
1939 drama films